The 165th Division was created in November 1948 under the Regulation of the Redesignations of All Organizations and Units of the Army, issued by Central Military Commission on November 1, 1948, basing on the 3rd Independent Division of Northeastern People's Liberation Army, formed in April 1948.

The division was under direct control of the Field Army.

In March 1949 the division was renamed as 208th Division and was transferred to Pingjin Garrison Command.

The division was then composed of:
622nd Infantry Regiment;
623rd Infantry Regiment;
624th Infantry Regiment.

In November 1950, the division was inactivated and parts were re-organized as 2nd Aviation Division of the PLAAF.

References

中国人民解放军各步兵师沿革, http://blog.sina.com.cn/s/blog_a3f74a990101cp1q.html

Infantry divisions of the People's Liberation Army
Military units and formations established in 1948
Military units and formations disestablished in 1950